HMS L14 was a L-class submarine built for the Royal Navy during World War I. She was one of five boats in the class to be fitted as a minelayer. The boat survived the war and was sold for scrap in 1934.

Design and description
L9 and its successors were enlarged to accommodate 21-inch (53.3 cm) torpedoes and more fuel. They displaced  on the surface and  submerged. The L-class submarines had a crew of 38 officers and ratings.

For surface running, the boats were powered by two 12-cylinder Vickers  diesel engines, each driving one propeller shaft. When submerged each propeller was driven by a  electric motor. They could reach  on the surface and  underwater.

The boats were armed with four 21-inch torpedo tubes in the bow and two 18-inch (45 cm) in broadside mounts. They carried four reload torpedoes for the 21-inch tubes for a grand total of ten torpedoes of all sizes. They were also armed with a  deck gun. L14 was fitted with 16 vertical mine chutes in her saddle tanks and carried one mine per chute.

Construction and career
HMS L14 was built by Vickers, Barrow. She was laid down on 19 January 1917. The boat was sold to John Cashmore Ltd in May 1934 for scrapping at Newport. The periscope from L14 is preserved at the Royal Navy Submarine Museum at Gosport. It may be the only surviving example of a World War I periscope. It was manufactured by Grubb & Co. in 1918.

Notes

References
 
 
 
 

 

British L-class submarines
Ships built in Barrow-in-Furness
1918 ships
World War I submarines of the United Kingdom
Royal Navy ship names